Lionel Sylvester Antoine (August 31, 1950 – December 7, 2021) was an American football offensive tackle for the Chicago Bears in the National Football League (NFL). He played college football at Southern Illinois University.

He was drafted by the Bears with the third-overall pick in the 1972 NFL Draft. He played seven seasons in the NFL before a knee injury ended his career. He died on December 7, 2021, at the age of 71.

References

1950 births
2021 deaths
American football offensive tackles
Chicago Bears players
Players of American football from Mississippi
Southern Illinois Salukis football players
Sportspeople from Biloxi, Mississippi